Mol is a Dutch surname. Meaning "mole" in Dutch, it may be descriptive in origin, or metonymic for a mole catcher. The name could also be patronymic (from the archaic name Molle) or toponymic, referring to the town Mol, Belgium in Antwerp province or a location named "the mole(s)". Among variant forms are De Mol ("the mole"), Demol (a West Flemish variant), Moll, Mols (a patronymic form), and Van Mol ("from the town Mol"). Notable people with these surnames include:

Alarda Mol (born 1982), Dutch cricketer
Albert Mol (1917–2004), Dutch author, actor and TV personality
Anders Mol (born 1997), Norwegian volleyball player
Annemarie Mol (born 1958), Dutch ethnographer and philosopher
Christelle Mol (born 1972), French badminton player
Dick Mol (born 1955), Dutch paleontologist and mammoth expert
Geert-Maarten Mol (born 1983), Dutch cricketer, brother of Hendrik-Jan
Gretchen Mol (born 1972), American model and actress
Hans Mol (1922–2017), Dutch-born Australian sociologist
Hendrik-Jan Mol (born 1977), Dutch cricketer, brother of Geert-Maarten
Jaap Mol (1912–1972), Dutch football forward
Leo Mol (1915–2009), Ukrainian-Canadian artist and sculptor
Michael Mol (born 1971), South African doctor and TV personality
Michiel Mol (born 1969), Dutch businessman and Formula One team director
Pieter Laurens Mol (born 1946), Dutch contemporary artist
Serge Mol (born 1970), Belgian martian arts historian and author
Simon Mol (1973–2008), pen name of Simon Moleke Njie, Cameroon-born journalist and writer
Tom Van Mol (born 1972), Belgian footballer
Wouter Mol (born 1982), Dutch cyclist
Woutherus Mol (1785–1857), Dutch painter

De Mol
 Christine De Mol (born 1954), Belgian applied mathematician and mathematical physicist
Joannes de Mol (1726–1782), Dutch minister and porcelain manufacturer
Joep de Mol (born 1995), Dutch field hockey player
John de Mol Jr. (born 1955), Dutch media tycoon, brother of Linda
Johnny de Mol (born 1979), Dutch actor and presenter, son of John Jr.
Linda de Mol (born 1964), Dutch actress and television presenter, sister of John Jr.
Ranlequin de Mol (fl. 15th century), Dutch composer
 (1846–1874), Belgian composer

Demol
Dirk Demol (born 1959), Belgian cyclist and directeur sportif
Els Demol (born 1958), Belgian New Flemish Alliance politician
François Demol (1895–1966), Belgian football defender and manager
Stéphane Demol (born 1966), Belgian football defender

Mols
Florent Mols (1811-1896), Belgian painter
Jonas Mols, Belgian poker player
 (1843-1918), Belgian philanthropist, daughter of Florent 
Michael Mols (born 1970), Dutch football striker
 (1848-1903), Belgian painter, son of FLorent
Stefan Mols (born 1999), Spanish football midfielder
Tonny Mols (born 1969), Belgian football midfielder
Van Mol
Pieter van Mol (1599–1650), Flemish painter
Tom Van Mol (born 1972), Belgian footballer

Other uses
 De Mol (TV series), a Belgium reality game show licensed in several international formats, commonly known in English countries as The Mole

See also
Moll (surname), German and Dutch surname
Mohl, German surname
Benjamin Mul (born 1969), Papua New Guinea politician
Jan Mul (1911–1971), Dutch church music composer
Tom De Mul (born 1986), Belgian football winger

References

Dutch-language surnames